San Carlos Airport may refer to:
San Carlos Airport, Mendoza in San Carlos, Mendoza, Argentina
San Carlos Airport (Nicaragua) in San Carlos, Rio San Juan, Nicaragua
San Carlos Airport (Venezuela) in San Carlos, Cojedes, Venezuela
San Carlos Airport (California) in San Carlos, California, U.S.

See also
San Carlos Gutierrez Airport in the Beni Department of Bolivia